José da Siva Coelho (born 5 August 1961) is a Portuguese retired footballer who played as a striker.

Club career
Born in Penafiel, Coelho made his professional – and Primeira Liga – debut in 1980–81 with FC Porto. Barred by the likes of English Mickey Walsh he hardly ever got ever a game, and moved after one sole season to Boavista FC, also in Porto.

During seven top flight campaigns, Coelho contributed to the Checquereds''' domestic and European consolidation, being regularly used either as a starter or from the bench and helping the team to three UEFA Cup participations. In 1988, he signed for another club in the top division, C.F. Estrela da Amadora, spending the following two years with as many teams still in that tier, and reaching double digits for both F.C. Penafiel and G.D. Chaves.

After an unassuming 1991–92 with former side Boavista, which nonetheless brought him the only major honour of his career, the Portuguese Cup, 31-year-old Coelho moved to the second level and joined another former club, Penafiel, after which he signed for F.C. Felgueiras, scoring 11 goals in 21 matches in his second year en route'' to top flight promotion. He closed out his career in 1997, after one year apiece with lowly F.C. Lixa and A.D. Sanjoanense.

International career
After the defection of practically all of the Portugal team following the infamous Saltillo Affair at the 1986 FIFA World Cup, Coelho benefitted from the situation and went on to earn eight caps in the following two years. He appeared for the nation during the unsuccessful UEFA Euro 1988 qualifying campaign, scoring in one of his first games, a 1–1 home draw against Sweden.

|}

Honours
Taça de Portugal: 1991–92; Runner-up 1980–81

External links

1961 births
Living people
People from Penafiel
Portuguese footballers
Association football forwards
Primeira Liga players
Liga Portugal 2 players
Segunda Divisão players
FC Porto players
Boavista F.C. players
C.F. Estrela da Amadora players
F.C. Penafiel players
G.D. Chaves players
F.C. Felgueiras players
F.C. Lixa players
A.D. Sanjoanense players
Portugal youth international footballers
Portugal under-21 international footballers
Portugal international footballers
Sportspeople from Porto District